Esomus, or flying barbs, are freshwater fish native to South and Mainland Southeast Asia. They are closely related to the genus Danio and are distinctive for their extremely long barbels.

Species 
 Esomus ahli Hora & Mukerji, 1928 (Burmese flying barb)
 Esomus altus (Blyth, 1860)
 Esomus barbatus (Jerdon, 1849) (South Indian flying barb)
 Esomus caudiocellatus C. G. E. Ahl, 1923
 Esomus danrica (F. Hamilton, 1822) (Indian flying barb)
 Esomus lineatus C. G. E. Ahl, 1923 (Striped flying barb)
 Esomus longimanus (Lunel, 1881) (Mekong flying barb)
 Esomus malabaricus F. Day, 1867
 Esomus malayensis C. G. E. Ahl, 1923 (Malayan flying barb)
 Esomus manipurensis Tilak & Jain, 1990
 Esomus metallicus C. G. E. Ahl, 1923 
 Esomus thermoicos (Valenciennes, 1842)

References
 

 
Cyprinidae genera
Freshwater fish genera
Taxa named by William John Swainson